Marie-Anne Lagimodière (née Gaboury; 15 August 1780 – 14 December 1875) was a French-Canadian woman noted as both the grandmother of Louis Riel, and as the first woman of European descent to travel to and settle in what is now Western Canada.

Early life 

Gaboury was born in Maskinongé, Quebec, a village near modern Trois-Rivières. As a young woman, she kept house for a priest there until her marriage on 21 April 1806 to Jean-Baptiste Lagimodière. Lagimodière was originally from nearby Saint-Ours; he had become a coureur des bois employed in the fur trade by the Hudson's Bay Company in Rupert's Land.

Travels in the west 

Immediately following their marriage, and in defiance of the custom of the time, Gaboury travelled to the west with her new husband. They went first to the area near the confluence of the Assiniboine and Red Rivers near what would later become the Red River Colony and eventually modern Winnipeg, Manitoba. They wintered at a Métis encampment near Pembina (under British sovereignty at the time but now in North Dakota), where the first of her eight children was born on 6 January 1807.

The following spring, the Lagimodières travelled to the valley of the Saskatchewan River, settling eventually in what is now northern Saskatchewan, where they remained until 1811, living a semi-nomadic lifestyle among other French-Canadian trappers and their native wives. During this period, Marie-Anne accompanied her husband on many trapping and buffalo hunting expeditions, often venturing as far west as present-day Alberta. Her second child was born on the open prairie shortly after her horse had bolted towards a herd of buffalo, and on another occasion she fought and shot a large bear that had attacked one of their companions.

The young family was once taken prisoner while trapping by Tsuu T'ina tribesmen because of their association with local Cree. Although they managed to escape on horseback, they were pursued for five days until reaching the safety of Fort des Prairie (also known as Fort Augustus, a counterpart to Fort Edmonton) near modern Edmonton, Alberta.

Before his marriage, Jean-Baptiste had previously been involved  (in the style of the country) with a native woman who had borne his children. Marie-Anne was tolerant and accepting of the children arising from this previous relationship, although the other woman was jealous and reportedly threatened to poison her. Despite this incident, the Lagimodières generally had good relationships with the Aboriginal peoples they encountered. Marie-Anne was often regarded as an object of curiosity by the Natives during her travels as she was invariably the first white woman they had ever seen (some were even led to believe that she possessed supernatural powers).

Return to the Red River 

On hearing that Lord Selkirk was establishing a permanent colony at the Red River, they returned to help establish the new Red River Colony in the spring of 1812. The early history of the settlement was characterized by struggles between the Hudson's Bay Company (HBC) and its rival, the North West Company, culminating in the Battle of Seven Oaks in 1816. Although the Lagimodières managed to avoid involvement with the violent confrontations, Jean-Baptiste was asked by HBC representative Colin Robertson to take news of the events to Lord Selkirk. Over the winter of 1815–1816, Lagimodière travelled over 2,900 km on horseback and on foot in fulfillment of this mission. During this time, Marie-Anne was obliged to seek shelter among the aboriginal tribes when the Nor'Westers took possession of Fort Douglas. On his return from the east, Jean-Baptiste was taken prisoner by the Nor'Westers and was imprisoned in Fort William until August 1816. The Lagimodières were not reunited until September 1816, after the unrest had subsided.

In recognition of his service, Lord Selkirk awarded Jean-Baptiste a tract of land near the Red River, which the Lagimodières successfully homesteaded for many years. They had six more children, including, in 1822, Julie Lagimodière, the future mother of Louis Riel. Dying at age 95 in 1875, Marie-Anne lived to see Manitoba become part of the Canadian Confederation following Riel's actions during the Red River Rebellion of 1869–1870.

Legacy 
She is sometimes remembered as the "Grandmother of the Red River", and many of the Métis people of the Canadian Prairies can trace their ancestry to her.

École Marie-Anne-Gaboury, a French immersion elementary school in St. Vital, Winnipeg, Manitoba, was named in her honour, as is Rue Marie Anne Gaboury in Bonnie Doon, Edmonton, Alberta, which is the home to the French-language section of the University of Alberta, the Campus Saint-Jean.

The 1978 Canadian feature film Marie-Anne tells a fictionalized story of "the first white woman in Western Canada".

See also 
Isobel Gunn, an HBC labourer who travelled to Rupert's Land disguised as a man.

References

Further reading
Goulet, Agnès. Marie-Anne Gaboury: Une femme dépareillée, Editions des plaines, 1989, 
Dugas, Georges. The first Canadian woman in the Northwest, Manitoba Free Press, 1902.
Grant MAcEwan. Marie Anne
Irene Ternier Gordon. Marie - Anne Lagimodière: The Incredible Story of Louis Riel's Grandmother. Heritage House Publishing Co; December 2003. .

External links 
Biography at the Dictionary of Canadian Biography Online
A biography
The Marie-Anne Gaboury cultural centre (French language)

1780 births
1875 deaths
Settlers of Canada
French Quebecers
People from Mauricie
Explorers of Canada
Female explorers
Persons of National Historic Significance (Canada)
Pre-Confederation Alberta people
Riel family (Canada)